Salta is a rural locality (a selo) in Gunibsky District, Republic of Dagestan, Russia. The population was 683 as of 2010.

Geography 
Salta is located 20 km east of Gunib (the district's administrative centre) by road. Silta and Kudali are the nearest rural localities.

References 

Rural localities in Gunibsky District